San Pedro is a district of the Pérez Zeledón canton, in the San José province of Costa Rica. It is located 30 kilometers south of San Isidro de El General.

History 
San Pedro was created on 5 October 1951 by Ley 1360, Anexa de Buenos Aires.

Geography 
San Pedro has an area of  km² and an elevation of  metres.

Demographics 

For the 2011 census, San Pedro had a population of  inhabitants.

Towns 
Zapotal, La Arenilla, Unión, Tambor, Cedral (parte), Fátima, Fortuna, Cristo Rey, Guaria, Santo Domingo, Santa Ana, San Rafael, Laguna, Rinconada Vega, San Juancito, San Juan, San Jerónimo.

Economy 
Coffee and tourist area on the slopes of the Chirripó National Park, agriculture, fattening cattle and milk.

Due to its area of 209.31 km2, San Pedro is the third district in territorial extension.
Many people have contributed to community development; Among them, the participation of Miguel Ángel Quesada Gamboa, Rodolfo Quirós (President of the first board of education), the Estrada and Ortiz families, Elías Mora, Vicente Elizondo and Marciano Zúñiga stand out.

On the other hand, more recently the work of who was a trustee and councilor, Fernando Umaña, is highlighted, who through his efforts many families managed to have a decent roof; likewise, it contributed to the arrangement of roads, educational infrastructure, health, among others.

Regarding production, its inhabitants dedicate themselves to raising and caring for milk and fattening cattle. Agriculture also occupies an important place and coffee, although with its instability of prices, continues to be a useful income for many families, who earn a little money with the harvesting of the grain.

Another of the projects that stand out in this district is the construction of the Liceo San Pedro, which in its first years of being founded earned the title as the best in academic performance, which is a source of pride for its inhabitants and neighbors. in general.

The tourist part can not go unnoticed either, and although it is not extensive, the foothills of the Chirripó National Park, become an attraction for the district.

With respect to road infrastructure, the improvement is notable; the ballast looks in better condition and from the Interamerican Highway to the population center, the street is paved.

Among the pioneers, Don Severiano Mora, a native of Poás de Aserrí, is remembered. He arrived in Pérez Zeledón from Acosta on October 22, 1946. He lived in La Trocha de Palmares, then in Los Chiles, and then left for San Pedro. Mora fought for this district to have electric light and when the water that was used for consumption arrived, it was taken from a ditch.

Transportation

Road transportation 
The district is covered by the following road routes:
 National Route 2
 National Route 327
 National Route 333

References 

Districts of San José Province
Populated places in San José Province